Jason DiSalvo is an American former professional Grand Prix motorcycle racer. He was the planned rider of the Castrol Rocket streamliner built to challenge the motorcycle land speed record, before being replaced by Guy Martin.

Career statistics

By season

Races by year
(key)

References

External links

1984 births
Living people
American motorcycle racers
125cc World Championship riders
250cc World Championship riders
Moto2 World Championship riders
Supersport World Championship riders
People from Stafford, New York